Dashadong Station, formerly Dashadi Station during planning, is a station on Line 5 of the Guangzhou Metro. It is located underground the junction of East Dashadi Road and Zhendong Road, in the Huangpu District. It opened on 28December 2009.

Station layout

Exits

References

Railway stations in China opened in 2009
Guangzhou Metro stations in Huangpu District